James Johnson Mathieson (born January 24, 1970) is a Canadian former  professional ice hockey player. Mathieson was a defencemanfor the Washington Capitals during the 1989–90 NHL season.  He was drafted by the Capitals in the 1989 NHL Entry Draft. Jim graduated from Luther College high school in Regina, Saskatchewan in 1988.

Career statistics

External links

1970 births
Living people
Ayr Scottish Eagles players
Baltimore Skipjacks players
Canadian expatriate ice hockey players in England
Canadian expatriate ice hockey players in Scotland
Canadian expatriate ice hockey players in the United States
Canadian ice hockey defencemen
Canadian people of British descent
Sportspeople from Kindersley
Ice hockey people from Saskatchewan
Ice Hockey Superleague players
New England Stingers players
Newcastle Cobras players
Newcastle Riverkings players
Nottingham Panthers players
Portland Pirates players
Regina Pats players
Washington Capitals draft picks
Washington Capitals players